La pura ("The pure") is a 1994 Mexican film. It stars Maribel Guardia and Manuel Capetillo hijo, directed by Roberto Guinar.

Cast
 Maribel Guardia ... Pura
 Manuel Capetillo hijo	... Rodrigo
 Rafael Buendía ... Don Teófilo
 Queta Lavat ... Doña Antonia Espinoza Corcuera
 Dino García ... Juancho
 Joaquín Cordero ... Padre Bernardo
 Josefina Echánove ... Doña Petra
 Mary Montiel ... Maria
 Raul Gonzalez
 Carlos Rotzinger ... Doctor Soto
 Arturo Alegría
 Paola Morelli	... Adriana
 Jesús Gómez ... Don Pepe
 Jorge Fegán
 María Elena Jasso

References

External links
 

1994 films
1994 comedy-drama films
1990s Spanish-language films
Mexican comedy-drama films
1990s Mexican films